Hologymnetis is a genus of fruit and flower chafers in the family Scarabaeidae. There are about eight described species in the genus Hologymnetis.

Species
These eight species belong to the genus Hologymnetis:
 Hologymnetis argenteola (Bates, 1889)
 Hologymnetis cinerea (Gory and Percheron, 1833)
 Hologymnetis kinichahau Ratcliffe & Deloya, 1992
 Hologymnetis margaritis (Bates, 1889)
 Hologymnetis moroni Ratcliffe & Deloya, 1992
 Hologymnetis reyesi Gasca Alvarez & Deloya, 2015
 Hologymnetis undulata (Vigors, 1825)
 Hologymnetis vulcanorum Ratcliffe & Deloya, 1992

References

Further reading

External links

 

Cetoniinae